Xylorhiza is a genus of beetles in the longhorn beetle family (Cerambycidae).

Species
 Xylorhiza adusta (Wiedemann, 1819)
 Xylorhiza dohrnii Lansberge, 1880
 Xylorhiza pilosipennis Breuning, 1943

References
 Worldwide Cerambycoidea Photo Gallery
 Biolib

Xylorhizini